Toril Marie Øie (born 17 July 1960) is Chief Justice of the Supreme Court of Norway.

She was born in Oslo, and graduated as cand.jur. in 1986. She worked in the Ministry of Justice and the Police from 1986 to 2006, except for the period 1988 to 1990 when she was an acting district stipendiary magistrate. From 1994 she was also a part-time university lector at University of Oslo. She was a Supreme Court Justice from 2004 to 2016.

References

Living people
1960 births
Supreme Court of Norway justices
Academic staff of the University of Oslo
Judges from Oslo
Norwegian women judges
Women chief justices